Giacomo Nizzolo (born 30 January 1989) is an Italian racing cyclist, who currently rides for UCI WorldTeam .

Career

Leopard Trek (2011–18)
Nizzolo took his first win at UCI World Tour level in August 2012, on stage 5 of the Eneco Tour.

He won the Points classification in the Giro d'Italia two years in a row in 2015 and 2016 without a stage win.

In 2018 Nizzolo was named as a rider in the Vuelta a España, he finished on the podium on 3 different stages.

Dimension Data (2019–21)
In July 2019, he was named in the startlist for the Tour de France. In 2020, Nizzolo won both the Italian National Road Race Championships and the road race at the UEC European Road Championships, in a sprint finish. He extended his contract by a further year, for the 2021 season. He took his first Grand Tour stage victory – after eleven previous second-place Giro d'Italia stage finishes – by winning the thirteenth stage of the 2021 Giro d'Italia, beating Edoardo Affini to the line in Verona.

Israel Start-Up Nation
With  encountering financial issues, Nizzolo signed a contract with the  team for the 2022 season.

Major results

2010
 9th Gran Premio della Liberazione
2011
 1st Stage 5 Bayern Rundfahrt
 2nd ProRace Berlin
 3rd Rund um Köln
 5th GP Ouest–France
 5th Trofeo Magaluf-Palmanova
 9th Trofeo Cala Millor
2012
 1st  Overall Tour de Wallonie
1st  Young rider classification
1st Stage 3
 Eneco Tour
1st  Points classification
1st Stage 5
 1st Stage 3 Tour du Poitou-Charentes
 3rd Vattenfall Cyclassics
 5th Overall Ster ZLM Toer
 5th Le Samyn
 7th GP Ouest–France
 9th Scheldeprijs
2013
 Tour de Luxembourg
1st  Points classification
1st Stages 2 & 3
 1st  Points classification, Volta ao Algarve
 2nd GP Ouest–France
2014
 1st Stage 3 Tour de San Luis
 1st Stage 2 Tour de Wallonie
 2nd Vattenfall Cyclassics
 3rd Paris–Bourges
 7th Brussels Cycling Classic
 9th GP Ouest–France
2015
 1st  Points classification, Giro d'Italia
 1st Gran Premio Nobili Rubinetterie
 3rd Vattenfall Cyclassics
 3rd Tre Valli Varesine
 3rd Paris–Bourges
 4th Coppa Ugo Agostoni
 5th Road race, European Games
 6th Grand Prix of Aargau Canton
 7th Coppa Bernocchi
 10th Brussels Cycling Classic
2016
 1st  Road race, National Road Championships
 1st  Points classification, Giro d'Italia
 1st Gran Piemonte
 1st Grand Prix of Aargau Canton
 1st Coppa Bernocchi
 Tour of Croatia
1st  Points classification
1st Stages 1 & 3
 1st Stage 1 Abu Dhabi Tour
 2nd Overall Dubai Tour
 3rd EuroEyes Cyclassics
 5th Road race, UCI Road World Championships
 6th Dwars door Vlaanderen
 8th Bretagne Classic
2018
 1st Stage 7 Vuelta a San Juan
 3rd London–Surrey Classic
 6th EuroEyes Cyclassics
 9th Grand Prix Pino Cerami
2019
 1st Stage 1 Vuelta a Burgos
 1st Stage 5 Tour of Slovenia
 1st Stage 6 Tour of Oman
 3rd EuroEyes Cyclassics
 6th London–Surrey Classic
 8th Primus Classic
 8th Kampioenschap van Vlaanderen
 9th Three Days of Bruges–De Panne
2020
 1st  Road race, UEC European Road Championships
 1st  Road race, National Road Championships
 1st Stage 2 Paris–Nice
 1st Stage 5 Tour Down Under
 2nd Kuurne–Brussels–Kuurne
 2nd Race Torquay
 2nd Circuito de Getxo
 5th Milan–San Remo
 6th Le Samyn
2021
 1st Clásica de Almería
 1st Circuito de Getxo
 Giro d'Italia
1st Stage 13
Held  after Stages 5–6
 2nd Gent–Wevelgem
 2nd Gran Piemonte
 4th Classic Brugge–De Panne
 4th Grand Prix of Aargau Canton
 8th Scheldeprijs
 9th Primus Classic
 10th Bretagne Classic
 10th Grand Prix d'Isbergues
2022
 Vuelta a Castilla y León
1st  Points classification
1st Stage 1
 2nd Heistse Pijl
 3rd Clásica de Almería
 3rd Trofeo Alcúdia – Port d'Alcúdia
 5th Kuurne–Brussels–Kuurne
 5th Egmont Cycling Race
 6th Elfstedenronde
 7th Trofeo Playa de Palma
 9th Ronde van Limburg
2023
 5th Clásica de Almería

Grand Tour general classification results timeline

Classic results timeline

References

External links

 
 
 
 
 
 

1989 births
Living people
Italian male cyclists
Cyclists from Milan
Cyclists at the 2015 European Games
European Games competitors for Italy
Italian Giro d'Italia stage winners